Events in the year 1972 in Norway.

Incumbents
 Monarch – Olav V
 Prime Minister – Trygve Bratteli (Labour Party) until 17 October, Lars Korvald (Christian Democratic Party)

Events
 15 June – The Norwegian pension age is lowered to 67.
 16 July – Divers discover the wreck of the Dutch merchant ship Akerendam which sank near the island Runde in 1725 during its maiden voyage killing the entire ship's crew of 200 people. A large gold and silver treasure was also discovered aboard the ship.
 25 September – Norwegian European Communities membership referendum where a 53.5 majority says "No" to joining the European Community
 The cabinet of Trygve Bratteli resigns as a direct result of the referendum
 18 October – Lars Korvald becomes Prime Minister of Norway
 18 October – Korvald's Cabinet was appointed.
 23 December – Braathens SAFE Flight 239 crashes in Asker upon landing at Fornebu airport, Oslo, Norway, killing 40 of 45 people on board.
 The Norwegian Ministry of the Environment is established
 Molde Airport, Årø is opened for traffic
 The Rock carvings at Alta are discovered
 Tripp Trapp, the original Norwegian designed adjustable wooden high chair for children, launched and soon became a best selling item in Norway

Popular culture

Sports

Music

Film

Literature
Bortreist på ubestemt tid, crime novel by Sigrun Krokvik.

Notable births

January
 
8 January – 
Lotte Søvre, sport wrestler.
Rune Støstad, politician.
11 January – Kåre Conradi, actor.
12 January – Espen Knutsen, hockey player
25 January – Anita Østby, politician.
28 January – Gøril Kringen, footballer.
31 January – Anne Holten, sport wrestler.

February
17 February – Johnny Jensen, handball player.
18 February – Glenn Solberg, handball player and coach.
27 February – Steinar Johansen, speed skater.

March
4 March – Nocturno Culto, musician
9 March – Ingrid Lorentzen, ballet dancer.
23 March – Line Verndal, actress.
28 March – Jeanette Lunde, alpine skier and sailor.

April
 

13 April – Kari-Anne Jønnes, politician.
13 April – Hugo Rocha, Norway-born Portuguese competitive sailor and Olympic medalist.
22 April – Jim Svenøy, middle-distance runner.
23 April – Barbro-Lill Hætta-Jacobsen, politician

June
 

12 June – Jan Steinar Engeli Johansen, politician 
16 June – Synnøve Konglevoll, politician.
24 June – Mette Gundersen, politician
27 June – Jeanette Nilsen, handball player.
28 June – Heikki Holmås, politician

July
 

13 July – Selma Lønning Aarø, writer.
25 July – Tage Pettersen, politician

August
14 August – Torkel Engeness, first ever Olympic flag bearer for Kyrgyzstan, despite being a Norwegian citizen and having no connection to Kyrgyzstan
18 August – B. Andreas Bull-Hansen, fantasy writer and former championship powerlifter
24 August – Christian Ruud, tennis player.

September
 

28 September 
 Anne Nymark Andersen, footballer.
 Nina Nymark Andersen, footballer.
30 September – Ari Behn, author (d. 2019)

October
30 October – Gro Espeseth, footballer.

November
6 November – Sveinung Stensland, politician.
16 November – Ingunn Bollerud, cyclist.
23 November – Alfie Haaland, footballer.
29 November – Hege Haukeland Liadal, politician.

December
2 December – Trond Fausa Aurvåg, actor.
16 December – Geir-Asbjørn Jørgensen, politician.
17 December – Alfred Bjørlo, politician.
18 December – Trine Strand, sport wrestler.

Notable deaths

5 January – Olav Midttun, philologist, biographer and magazine editor (b.1883)
6 January – Hans Mikal Solsem, politician (b.1912)
2 February – Einar Staff, wholesaler (born 1889).
3 February – Sverre Grøner, gymnast and Olympic silver medallist (b.1890)
3 March – Oskar Slaaen, politician (b.1907)
29 March – Reidar Magnus Aamo, politician (b.1898)
4 April – Haldis Tjernsberg, politician (b.1903)
7 April – Mons Arntsen Løvset, politician (b.1891)
11 April – Reidar Ødegaard, cross country skier and Olympic bronze medallist (b.1901)
22 April – 
 Isak Abrahamsen, gymnast and Olympic gold medallist (b.1891)
 Arne Espeland, writer (b. 1885)
18 May – Gunnar Thoresen, bobsledder (b.1921)
7 June – Bjarne Eilif Thorvik, politician (b.1908)
13 June – Per Severin Hjermann, politician (b.1891)
16 July – Knut Severin Jakobsen Vik, politician (b.1892)
17 July – Oscar Engelstad, gymnast and Olympic bronze medallist (b.1882)
30 July – Arne Sunde, politician, Olympic shooter, army officer and diplomat (b.1883)
1 September – Tor Lund, gymnast and Olympic gold medallist (b.1888)
6 September – Terje Wold, judge, politician and Minister (b.1899)
14 September – Oddmund Myklebust, politician and Minister (b.1915)
15 September – Erik Hesselberg, sailor and crew member on the Kon-Tiki expedition (b. 1914)
18 September – Gunvald Engelstad, politician (b.1900)
22 September – Olaf Solumsmoen, newspaper editor and politician (b.1896)
28 September – Ole Bae, civil servant (b.1902)
29 September – Nils Ebbessøn Astrup, ship owner (born 1901).
8 October – Karl Johan Fjermeros, politician (b.1885)
11 October – Nils Fixdal, athlete (b.1889)
17 October – Alf Gowart Olsen, shipowner (born 1912).
19 October – Jacob Christie Kielland, architect (b.1897)
October – Reidar Rye Haugan, newspaper publisher in America (b.1893)
11 November – Guri Johannessen, politician (b.1911)
1 December – Harald Houge Torp, politician (b.1890)
7 December – Arne Kildal, librarian and civil servant (b.1885)
12 December – Rasmus Birkeland, sailor and Olympic gold medallist (b.1888).

Full date unknown
Petter Martinsen, gymnast and Olympic gold medallist (b.1887)
Gunnar Schjelderup, businessperson (b.1895)
Jon Sundby, politician and Minister (b.1883)
Helge Thiis, architect and art critic (b.1897)
Jørgen Vogt, newspaper editor and politician (b.1900)

See also

References

External links